This is a list of notable people from Riverview, New Brunswick, Canada. Although not everyone in this list was born in Riverview, they all live or have lived in Riverview and have had significant connections to the community.  If people are in this article, do not include them in the list of people from Albert County.

See also
List of people from New Brunswick

References

Riverview, New Brunswick
Riverview